Johann Sebastian Bach composed the church cantata  (Bring to the Lord the honor due His name), 148, probably in 1723 in Leipzig for the 17th Sunday after Trinity.

History and words 
Bach probably wrote the cantata in 1723 in his first year in Leipzig for the 17th Sunday after Trinity. The prescribed readings for the Sunday were from the Epistle to the Ephesians, the admonition to keep the unity of the Spirit, and from the Gospel of Luke, healing a man with dropsy on the Sabbath. The cantata text refers not to the healing, but to the honour due to God on the Sabbath. The words for the opening chorus are from Psalm 29. The lyrics of the cantata are based on a poem in six verses of Picander, "", published in 1725 in his first spiritual book . The Bach scholar Alfred Dürr has nevertheless reason to date the cantata in 1723 already, suggesting that the cantata text may have preceded the poem, but there is no certain evidence that the cantata was not composed some years later.

The first recitative describes the desire for God as expressed in Psalm 42, "As the hart panteth after the water brooks, so panteth my soul after thee, O God." Only the melody of the closing chorale "Auf meinen lieben Gott" (Lübeck, 1603) is known. Some musicologists including Werner Neumann suggested the words of the fifth verse of that chorale, others such as Philipp Spitta and the edition of the Bach Gesellschaft preferred the final verse of Johann Heermann's hymn "" (1630) which was sung on the same melody in Leipzig.

Bach probably first performed the cantata on 19 September 1723.

Scoring and structure 
In accord with the festive theme, the cantata is scored for alto and tenor soloists, a four-part choir, and a Baroque instrumental ensemble of trumpet, three oboes, two violins, viola, and basso continuo. It is structured in six movements.

 Chorus: 
 Aria (tenor, violin): 
 Recitative (alto, strings): 
 Aria (alto, oboes): 
 Recitative (tenor): 
 Choral:

Music 
The opening chorus begins with as instrumental sinfonia, presenting the themes. The choir sings two fugues on different themes, but both derived from the beginning of the sinfonia. The trumpet plays a fifth part in the fugues. The movement concludes with the voices embedded in the sinfonia.

The alto recitative is accompanied by the strings. In the following aria the mystical unity of the soul with God is expressed in the unusual scoring for two oboe d'amore and oboe da caccia. The closing chorale is set for four parts.

Recordings 
 J. S. Bach: Cantatas BWV 140 & BWV 148, Wolfgang Gönnenwein, Süddeutscher Madrigalchor, Consortium Musicum, Janet Baker, Theo Altmeyer, EMI 1967
 Bach Cantatas Vol. 4 – Sundays after Trinity I, Karl Richter, Münchener Bach-Chor, Münchener Bach-Orchester, Julia Hamari, Peter Schreier, Archiv Produktion 1977
 Die Bach Kantate Vol. 52, Helmuth Rilling, Gächinger Kantorei, Bach-Collegium Stuttgart, Helen Watts, Kurt Equiluz, Hänssler 1977
 J. S. Bach: Das Kantatenwerk – Sacred Cantatas Vol. 8, Nikolaus Harnoncourt, Tölzer Knabenchor, Concentus Musicus Wien, Leonhardt-Consort, Paul Esswood, Kurt Equiluz, Teldec 1985
 J. S. Bach: Complete Cantatas Vol. 7, Ton Koopman, Amsterdam Baroque Orchestra & Choir, Bogna Bartosz, Gerd Türk, Antoine Marchand 1997
 J. S. Bach: Cantatas Vol. 14 – Cantatas from Leipzig 1723, Masaaki Suzuki, Bach Collegium Japan, Robin Blaze, Gerd Türk, BIS 2000
 Bach Cantatas Vol. 4, John Eliot Gardiner, Monteverdi Choir, English Baroque Soloists, Frances Bourne, Mark Padmore, Soli Deo Gloria 2000

References

Sources 
 
 Bringet dem Herrn Ehre seines Namens BWV 148; BC A 140 / Sacred cantata (17th Sunday after Trinity ) Bach Digital
 Cantata BWV 148 Bringet dem Herrn Ehre seines Namens history, scoring, sources for text and music, translations to various languages, discography, discussion, Bach Cantatas Website
 BWV 148 Bringet dem Herrn Ehre seines Namens English translation, University of Vermont
 BWV 148 Bringet dem Herrn Ehre seines Namens text, scoring, University of Alberta
 Chapter 20 BWV 102 BWV 148 Bringet dem Herrn Ehre seines Namens / Give the Lord the glory of His name. Julian Mincham, 2010
 
 Luke Dahn: BWV 148.6 bach-chorales.com

Church cantatas by Johann Sebastian Bach
1723 compositions
Psalm-related compositions by Johann Sebastian Bach